BYN may refer to:
 Bayankhongor Airport, Mongolia: IATA airport code BYN
 Belarusian ruble, by ISO 4217 currency code
 Bilen language: ISO language code BYN
 Bryan (Amtrak station), Ohio, United States: Amtrak station code BYN
 Bryn railway station, England, United Kingdom: National Rail station code BYN